Adilson Malanda (born 29 October 2001) is a French professional footballer who plays as defender for Major League Soccer club Charlotte FC.

Career
Malanda made his professional debut with  Nîmes in a 2–1 Ligue 1 loss to Dijon on 23 December 2020.

On 4 August 2022, Malanda signed with Major League Soccer side Charlotte FC.

Personal life
Born in France, Malanda is of Congolese descent.

References

External links
 
 Nîmes Olympique Profile

2001 births
Living people
Footballers from Rouen
French footballers
French sportspeople of Democratic Republic of the Congo descent
Association football defenders
Ligue 1 players
Ligue 2 players
Championnat National 2 players
Championnat National 3 players
Nîmes Olympique players
Rodez AF players
Black French sportspeople
Charlotte FC players
Major League Soccer players